Giovanni Francesco Nicolai, O.F.M. (died 1737) was a Roman Catholic prelate who served as Vicar Apostolic of Houkouang (1696–1737), Titular Archbishop of Myra (1712–1737), and Titular Bishop of Berytus (1696–1712).

Biography
Giovanni Francesco Nicolai was born in Leonessa, Italy and ordained a priest in the Order of Friars Minor.
When the Apostolic Vicariate of Nanking was elevated to a diocese, he was chosen by newly named Bishop Gregory Luo Wenzao as his assistant and successor (on May 29, 1688, the Holy See had granted Wenzao the right to choose and nominate his successor). Upon Wenzao's death on February 27, 1691, he served as administrator of the diocese.
On 20 October 1696, he was appointed during the papacy of Pope Innocent XII as the first Vicar Apostolic of Houkouang (the Apostolic Vicariate of Houkouang had been carved out of the Apostolic Vicariate of Fujian in the same year) and Titular Bishop of Berytus.
On 7 March 1700, he was consecrated bishop in Rome by Sperello Sperelli, Cardinal-Priest of San Giovanni a Porta Latina, with Odoardo Cibo, Titular Patriarch of Constantinople, and Domenico Belisario de Bellis, Bishop of Molfetta, serving as co-consecrators.
On 20 April 1712, he was promoted during the papacy of Pope Clement XI as Titular Archbishop of Myra. 
He served as Vicar Apostolic of Houkouang until his death on 27 December 1737.

Episcopal succession

References

External links and other references
 (for Chronology of Bishops) 
 (for Chronology of Bishops) 

17th-century Roman Catholic bishops in China
18th-century Roman Catholic bishops in China
Bishops appointed by Pope Innocent XII
Bishops appointed by Pope Clement XI
1737 deaths
Franciscan bishops